The Ferry-Dusika-Hallenstadion was an indoor arena in Vienna, Austria. It was built in 1976, held 7,700 spectators and hosted indoor sporting events such as track cycling, tennis and athletics. It hosted an annual indoor track and field meeting – the Vienna Indoor Classic.

It was named after Austrian cyclist Franz Dusika. The arena hosted the last cycling competition in July 2021. Afterwards the building was torn down. In its place, a new arena called "Sportarena Wien" will be built until 2023. The new indoor arena will not feature a velodrome.  This was criticized by the Austrian Cycling Federation because they were not involved in the planning.

Past events
1979 European Athletics Indoor Championships
1987 UCI Track Cycling World Championships
1999 Men's European Volleyball Championship
2002 European Athletics Indoor Championships
2010 European Judo Championships

See also
 List of indoor arenas in Austria

References

External links 

 wien.at | Ferry Dusika Hallenstadion

Velodromes in Austria
Indoor arenas in Austria
Tennis venues in Austria
Volleyball venues in Austria
Cycle racing in Austria
Indoor track and field venues
Sports venues in Vienna
Defunct indoor arenas